The Pacific Maritime Ecozone, as defined by the Commission for Environmental Cooperation (CEC), is a Canadian terrestrial ecozone, spanning a strip approximately 200 kilometres wide along the British Columbia Coast, then narrowing along the border with Alaska. It also includes all marine islands of British Columbia and a small portion of the southwestern corner of the Yukon. Fourteen ecoregions comprise the Ecozone, ranging from the Mount Logan Ecoregion in the north to the Cascade Ecoregion and Lower Mainland Ecoregion in the south.

The name of the comparable ecozones in the United States, where Level II ecoregions correspond to the international term "ecozone", are the Marine West Coast Forest and the Northwestern Forested Mountains ecoregions.  In the floristic province system, the region is described as part of the Rocky Mountain Floristic Region.

Also in use is a system of biogeoclimatic zones defined and used by the British Columbia government, which defines the same area as the Coastal Western Hemlock zone, though a small portion flanking the Strait of Georgia comprises the Coastal Douglas-fir zone.  In the different ecoregion system established by the World Wildlife Fund, the region corresponds to the Pacific temperate rain forests ecoregion, sub-ecoregions of which are the Haida Gwaii ecoregion, Vancouver Island ecoregion, and British Columbia mainland coastal forests ecoregions.

Geography
This ecozone is the most diverse in Canada, and perhaps the world. Its northern inland extent is primarily alpine tundra, whereas the picturesque northern coast features numerous fjords and valleys, with massive glaciers common in the mountains. To the south, the small flatland of the Fraser Valley is located at the southern end of the Coast Mountains, noted for temperate rainforests. In its marine areas are notable undersea kelp forests.

Lying on the Pacific Ring of Fire, it exhibits many hot springs.

Ecoprovinces
This ecozone can be further subdivided into three ecoprovinces:
Georgia Depression
Northern Coastal Mountains
Southern Coastal Mountains

Climate
This zone experiences the warmest and wettest climate in Canada. The lower Georgia Strait may receive as little as 600 mm of annual precipitation, but other areas in this zone receive as much as 3,000 mm. Moderated by the influence of the Pacific Ocean, the zone experiences mild winters and cool summers. Mean temperatures vary little throughout the year; January means are between 4 and 6 °C, and July means are between 12 and 18 °C.

Flora and fauna
The region is the only home for some species of birds, including the American black oystercatcher, the chestnut-backed chickadee and the tufted puffin. The Gulf Islands and Saanich Peninsula contain "the last remnants of the highly endangered Garry oak ecosystem".

The Great Bear Rainforest is located entirely within this ecozone.

Conservation

National parks
Four national parks have been established in this ecozone:
 Gulf Islands National Park Reserve
 Gwaii Haanas National Park Reserve and Haida Heritage Site
 Kluane National Park and Reserve
 Pacific Rim National Park Reserve

Provincial parks
Dozens of provincial parks have been established in this ecozone. Some of the largest and most notable ones include:
Fiordland Conservancy
Garibaldi Provincial Park
Juan de Fuca Provincial Park
Kitlope Heritage Conservancy
Strathcona Provincial Park
Tatshenshini-Alsek Provincial Park

References

Ecozones and ecoregions of British Columbia
Geography of Yukon
Geography of the Pacific Northwest